Cleptes semicyaneus is a species of cuckoo wasps in the subfamily Cleptinae. It is found in Europe.

References 

 Hymenopterák. Hymenopteren. S Mocsáry, GV Szépligeti, 1901
 A hazai Primulák földrajzi elterjedése. S Mocsáry, Természetrajzi Füz, 1901

External links 

 Cleptes semicyaneus at insectoid.info

Insects described in 1879
Hymenoptera of Europe
Cleptinae